Mobile Workflows within mobile technology are specialized workflows. The purpose is to address deployment of workflows in mobile device infrastructure, thus enabling automation of process interaction for traditional business processes from within the device.

References
Mobile Process - Workflows for Mobile centric services composition 

"Developing Workflow Engine for Mobile Devices", Lasse Pajunen, Suresh Chande, The 11th International conference on EDOC-2007, 15–19 October 2007, Annapolis, Maryland, USA.
"Designing User Interfaces for Mobile Business Processes using Messaging Interfaces", Lasse Pajunen, Suresh Chande, Sameh Galal, SABRE, Leipzig, Germany, 24–27 September 2007.
"Mobile Process Forms - An unified Messaging Interface", Suresh Chande, Lasse Pajunen, Sameh Galal, WWW/internet 2007, Vila Real, Portugal, 5–8 October 2007
"ActiveForms: A Runtime for Mobile Application Forms", Suresh Chande, Lasse Pajunen,The 6th International Conference on mobile business ICMB 2007, July 9–11, Toronto Canada.
"Modeling and Generating Mobile Business Processes",Lasse Pajunen, Anna Ruokonen, In the proceedings of The IEEE International Conference on Web Services (ICWS), Salt Lake City, Utah, USA, July 2007

Mobile technology